Zaidoon Treeko  (born October 10, 1961 in Baghdad, Iraq), is an Iraqi Oud player, composer, and poet.

Zaidoon Treeko, whose first name is also written alternatively as ZAIDOON, ZT, Zaidoon and his family name alternatively as TREEKO, Treeko and zt, has established himself as one of the most successful Oud makers and developers in the history of the Arab World, since the start of his career.

He began studying the oud at the age of 9 in Baghdad, following in the footsteps of his friends and teachers Hussein Kaddouri, Ruhi Khammash, Aram Abu khyam and Dean Mokhlid Mukhtar. He received his diploma from the Baghdad Academy of Music in 1984. He was the first on his class playing the Oud and top 10 in Iraq. He began to teach the oud and making it during his years at the academy, as well as continuing his own studies. Zaidoon Treeko has composed music for films, plays and television.

Biography 
Zaidoon is a Mandaean born in Baghdad on October 12, 1961.

References 
S Bros. Entertainment
Zaidoon Treeko Official Website
Zaidoon Treeko Official Facebook Page
Lyrical poetry evening in solidarity with Iraq and Palestine in the Writers Union of the Emirates, Abu Dhabi, Al Bayan Retrieved on 2016-01-14, Published on 02, April 2003
A poetry evening of Cultural Foundation in the Writers Union of the Emirates, Abu Dhabi, Al Bayan Retrieved on 2016-01-14, Published on 17, April 2002
Salaman Ya Yad Al-Zaman – سلاماً يا يدَ الزمنِ – Zaidoon Treeko Published on December 12, 2015
Satar Rafaat Ras – ستار رفعة راس – Zaidoon Treeko Published on May 24, 2013

1961 births
Living people
People from Baghdad
Iraqi musicians
Iraqi Mandaeans
Iraqi oud players